The 1952–53 season was Manchester United's 51st season in the Football League, and their eighth consecutive season in the top division of English football.

The regeneration of squad continued as younger players continued to take the place of the players who had been in the 1948 FA Cup winning team and the previous season's title campaign. Making their senior debuts this season were teenagers Duncan Edwards, a half-back from Dudley, and Doncaster-born winger David Pegg. Also joining the ranks was 21-year-old centre-forward Tommy Taylor from Barnsley for a club record fee of £29,999 in April 1953, a month before Edwards made his debut.

FA Charity Shield

First Division

FA Cup

Squad statistics

References

Manchester United F.C. seasons
Manchester United